= Snir Yamin =

Israeli singer-songwriter (born 1990)

Snir Yamin שניר ימין
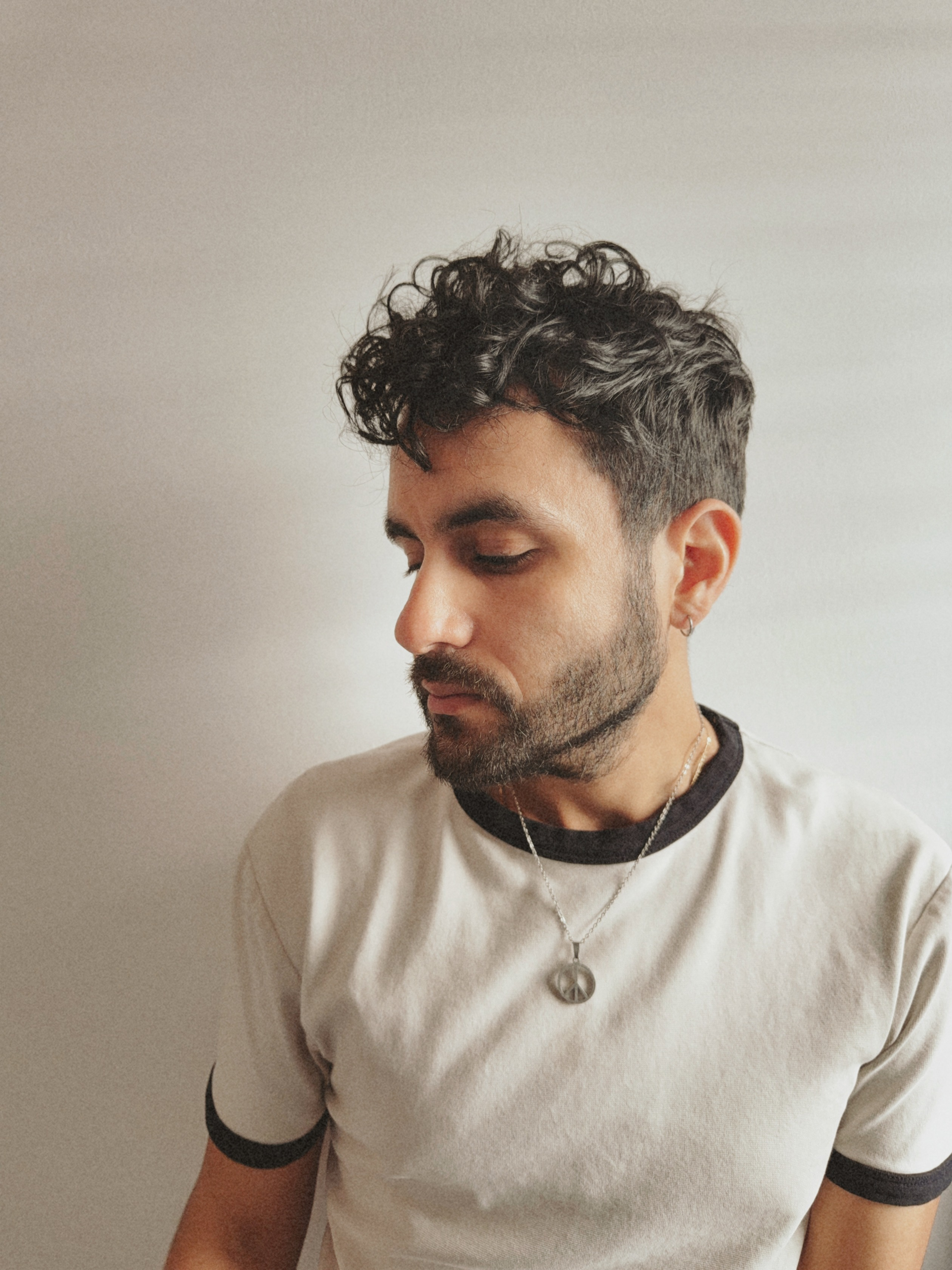
- Yamin in 2026

Background information
- Born: February 24, 1990 (age 36); Kfar Saba, Israel
- Origin: Tel Aviv, Israel
- Genres: Indie folk; alternative pop
- Occupations: Singer; songwriter
- Instruments: Vocals; guitar; piano
- Years active: 2006–present
- Labels: Nana Disc; AWAL
- Website: sniryamin.com

Snir Yamin (Hebrew: שניר ימין; born 24 February 1990) is an Israeli singer-songwriter based in New York City. His 2023 single "Aftermath" reached number two on Spotify's chart in Israel.

== Career ==
Yamin began releasing music in Israel in the early 2010s. His debut EP, Urban Stories, appeared in 2013, followed by the mini-album Yofi Shel Sheket (2014) on Nana Disc and the Concrete City EP in 2016.

Yamin released the single "Down the Line" in 2018. In 2023 he released the single "Aftermath", which reached number two on Spotify's chart in Israel. In 2025 he announced a United States tour and a duet with the singer Shira Averbuch. In June 2026 he released the single "Low Tide" through AWAL and Nana Disc.

== Discography ==
=== Albums ===
- Yofi Shel Sheket (2014)

=== EPs ===
- Urban Stories (2013)
- Concrete City (2016)

=== Singles ===
- "Taking" (2015)
- "Down the Line" (2018)
- "Aftermath" (2023)
- "Low Tide" (2026)

== Music videos ==
| Year | Title | Director |
|---|---|---|
| 2013 | "Stay" | Sahar Golovaty |
| 2015 | "Taking" | Sean Zelinger |
| 2018 | "down the line" (lyric video) | |
| 2023 | "aftermath" (lyric video) | |
| 2026 | "low tide" (lyric video) | |
